Vice-Admiral Harold Tom Baillie-Grohman, CB, DSO, OBE (16 January 1888 – 23 September 1978) was a Royal Navy officer.

Biography 
Born in Victoria, British Columbia, Baillie-Grohman was the son of the writer William Adolf Baillie Grohman and of Florence, née Nickalls, daughter of Tom Nickalls.

Baillie-Grohman entered HMS Britannia as a cadet in 1903 and was promoted Lieutenant in 1909. In 1914, he was given command of the destroyer HMS Lively in March 1914, and subsequently commanded HMS Ghurka, HMS Gentian, and HMS Totnes during the First World War, serving both in the Grand Fleet and the Dover Patrol. Promoted to Lieutenant-Commander in 1917, he was appointed DSO in 1918 for his part in minesweeping operations.

After the First World War, Baillie-Grohman was employed on minesweeping operations off the coast of Belgium, then commanded the sloop HMS Crocus in the Persian Gulf. He was appointed OBE in 1923 and promoted to Commander. After commanding the 1st Minesweeper Flotilla from 1923 to 1925, he was posted to Australia as Assistant Chief of the Naval Staff at the Navy Office, Melbourne, from 1925 to 1927. In 1928, he attended the Staff College, Camberley, and was Executive Officer of HMS Tiger until 1930, when he was promoted to captain. From 1931 to 1933, he was the head of the British naval mission to China, with the rank of Commodore in the Chinese Navy.

Second World War 
In April 1941, Baillie-Grohman organised the naval evacuation of the British and Commonwealth forces in Greece under difficult circumstances after the German invasion, "the outstanding achievement of his career", for which he was appointed CB. He was appointed Rear Admiral Combined Operations in 1942, but had to relinquish the appointment due to illness.

On 8 May 1945, he hoisted the White Ensign over the German naval headquarters at Kiel.

In addition to his British decorations, Baillie-Grohman also received the Belgian Order of Leopold, as well as to the Order of the Star of Ethiopia and the Chinese Order of Brilliant Jade..

References 

 
 

1888 births
1978 deaths
Royal Navy vice admirals
Royal Navy admirals of World War II
Companions of the Order of the Bath
Companions of the Distinguished Service Order
Officers of the Order of the British Empire
Canadian military personnel from British Columbia
Recipients of orders, decorations, and medals of Ethiopia